Gimri may refer to:
Gimry, Dagestan, Russia
Gyumri, Armenia